Rock Grove Township may refer to the following townships in the United States:

 Rock Grove Township, Stephenson County, Illinois
 Rock Grove Township, Floyd County, Iowa